Christiane "Nane" Putzich (born 20 November 1975 in Hofgeismar as Christiane Steger) is a German wheelchair curler.

She participated in the 2010 and 2018 Winter Paralympics where German wheelchair curling team finished on eighth place both times.

Teams

Mixed doubles

References

External links 
 
  (2010)
  (2018)
 
 
 "Christiane Putzich | Samsung Paralympic Blogger" playlist on YouTube (10 videos)
  (video)

1975 births
Living people
German female curlers
German wheelchair curlers
German disabled sportspeople
Paralympic wheelchair curlers of Germany
Wheelchair curlers at the 2010 Winter Paralympics
Wheelchair curlers at the 2018 Winter Paralympics
People from Hofgeismar
Sportspeople from Kassel (region)
21st-century German women